Paul Reid, formerly Paul Gary James Ridge, (born 4 September 1982), better known by the stage name Drapht, is an Australian hip hop artist from Perth. Drapht is a member of the Syllabolix (SBX) crew, a collective that includes fellow Perth-based hip hop artists such as Downsyde.

Biography

1982–2002: Early life
Drapht grew up in North Perth, Western Australia, a suburb of Perth. His father, Gary Ridge, a jazz drummer introduced Drapht to music from a very young age—he first experienced hip hop at the age of eight. The name "Drapht" is based on a Western Australian Swan Brewery beer, Swan Draught; the company's logo was written on a watch that his father brought home when Drapht was 13 or 14.

Drapht attended Perth Modern School in Subiaco but was not involved in the school's music program. At school he became friends with Damien Allia (aka DJ Armee) who introduced him to hip hop via gigs at the Hyde Park Hotel.

Drapht became a vital part of Perth's hip hop crew, Syllabolix, at the age of 17."I was extremely fortunate. Right place, right time. I was right in the middle of it all, I had access to one of the best producers at the time Dazastah, freestyle sessions at Hunter's and constant schooling from the rest of the MC's within the crew. So I was very blessed with it all." — Drapht

This involvement resulted in his first contributions being recorded and included on Hunter and Dazastah's 2000 debut album, Done DL, only months after he had started seriously writing.

2003–2004: Pale Rider
Drapht's first track, "Misunderstood", was released as part of the Culture of Kings – Volume 3 release in 2003 with Drapht saying "It was a song I wrote in a span of a day or so, and it was just lying around. So I had the opportunity to put it on Culture of Kings.  And then it ended up being the opening track for the release, which was awesome. That definitely helped in the early days of my career."

His debut album, Pale Rider, was released in October 2003, with all production handled by Dazastah (Downsyde), Fdel and Drapht. Special appearances on the album include: Fdel (Invada Records), Downsyde, MC Layla, Hunter, Selekt, Carlsani and Porsah Lane.

2005–2007: Who Am I
The follow-up, 2005's Who Am I, was co-produced by Dazastah (Downsyde) and Fdel, and co-mixed by Drapht with Dazastah. The songs touch on topics including politics, sex, and addiction to drunken antics. Guest appearances on the album include Pressure (Hilltop Hoods), Downsyde, Layla, Pegz (Obese Records), Clandestien, MJ (Funkola) and Hunter. It was released by Obese Records in both in a CD and a limited 2 LP vinyl format. Two tracks from the album, "Drink Drank Drunk" and "The Music", received airplay on Triple J, mostly on the Super Request program.  Who Am I is more an introspective album. 

The song, "The Music", was selected by Triple J as a featured track for "AusMusic Month" in 2005. Drapht also released a music video for "The Music", which was shown on Rage. He also performed a guest verse on the track, "The Blue Blooded", which was included on the Hilltop Hoods' 2006 album, The Hard Road.

Drapht has opened for acts such as; Hilltop Hoods, Dilated Peoples, Downsyde, Koolism, Apathy, Rodney P & Skitz, Mystro, Killa Kela, and Resin Dogs.

2008–2009: Brothers Grimm
Drapht's third album, Brothers Grimm, was released 10 May 2008, with the first song from the album, "Jimmy Recard", receiving significant airplay on Triple J, where it became the second most played song on the station in 2008

The album debuted at No. 64 on the ARIA Album charts, reached No. 9 on the AIR (Association of Independent Record Labels) Charts and No. 10 on the ARIA (Australian Recording Industry Association) Top 40 Urban Album charts.

2010–2015: The Life of Riley
In an interview with The Vine in November 2010, Drapht advised that he had not renewed his contract with Obese Records and that he will be releasing his forthcoming album The Life of Riley independently. The first song released from the album is "Rapunzel", for which he describes:

The Life of Riley was released 1 April 2011 and was the first release on Drapht’s own label The Ayems, which is distributed through Sony Music. The album debuted at #1 on the ARIA Album Chart and was the first Australian artist to do so in 2011. The second track to be taken from the album was "Sing It (The Life of Riley)".

2016–present: Seven Mirrors and Arabella Street
Drapht released Seven Mirrors in August 2016, which peaked at number 4 on the ARIA Albums Chart.

Arabella Street was released in November 2018.

Touring
In March 2009, Drapht undertook a national tour of Australia with fellow Western Australians, Downsyde with a number of the eastern states performances being supported by Pez. Drapht also made appearances at Homebake, Pyramid Rock Festival, Southbound, Open Arms and MS Fest.

Drapht appeared at the 2011 Groovin' the Moo festival and undertook a national tour to promote the album, with support from Mantra and The Tongue.

Drapht was the opening act for American musical duo Twenty One Pilots during the Australia and New Zealand leg of The Bandito Tour in December 2018.

Discography

Albums

Singles

Compilation appearances
 Culture of Kings Volume 3 (2003, Obese) (song: "Misunderstood")

Other appearances

Alongside many other Australian hip hop artists, Drapht appears in the music video for the Hilltop Hoods song, "Rattling the Keys to the Kingdom" (2012).

Awards and nominations

AIR Awards
The Australian Independent Record Awards (commonly known informally as AIR Awards) is an annual awards night to recognise, promote and celebrate the success of Australia's Independent Music sector.

|-
| 2008
|himself
| Best New Independent Artis
| 
|-
| rowspan="2" |2011
| rowspan="2" | The Life of Riley
| Best Independent Album
| 
|-
| Best Independent Hip Hop/Urban Album
| 
|-

APRA Awards
The APRA Awards are presented annually from 1982 by the Australasian Performing Right Association (APRA), "honouring composers and songwriters". Drapht has been nominated for four awards.

|-
|2011 || "Rapunzel" (Paul Reid, Daniel Rankine, Larry Siler) || Urban Work of the Year || 
|-
|rowspan="2"|2012 || rowspan="2"|"Sing It (The Life of Riley)" (Paul Reid, Daniel Rankine) || Urban Work of the Year || 
|-
| Breakthrough Songwriter of the Year || 
|-
|2013 || Paul Reid, Daniel Rankine || Breakthrough Songwriter of the Year ||

ARIA Awards
The ARIA Music Awards are presented annually from 1987 by the Australian Recording Industry Association (ARIA). In 2011 Drapht won two awards from eight nominations.

|-
|rowspan="7"| 2011 || rowspan="2"|"Rapunzel" || Single of the Year || 
|-
| Breakthrough Artist – Single || 
|-
| "Rapunzel" – Dave Parkin || Engineer of the Year || 
|-
| rowspan="3"| The Life of Riley || Best Male Artist || 
|-
| Breakthrough Artist – Album || 
|-
| Best Urban Album || 
|-
| Drapht || Most Popular Australian Artist || 
|-
| 2016 || Seven Mirrors || Best Urban Album || 
|-

J Award
The J Awards are an annual series of Australian music awards that were established by the Australian Broadcasting Corporation's youth-focused radio station Triple J. They commenced in 2005.

|-
| J Awards of 2011
|The Life of Riley
| Australian Album of the Year
|

West Australian Music Industry Awards
The West Australian Music Industry Awards (WAMIs) are annual awards presented to the local contemporary music industry, put on annually by the Western Australian Music Industry Association Inc (WAM). Drapht  has won two awards.

 (wins only)
|-
| 2009
| Drapht
| Best Urban/Hip Hop Act
| 
|-
| 2011
| Drapht
| Best Urban/Hip Hop Act
| 
|-

Notes

References

External links

 

1982 births
ARIA Award winners
Australian hip hop musicians
Australian male rappers
Living people
Obese Records artists
People educated at Perth Modern School
Rappers from Perth, Western Australia
Sony Music Australia artists